Shamrao Madkaikar (1910 – 24 December 2011) was a freedom fighter and a leader of Communist Party of India from the Indian state of Goa. Madkaikar established the Gomantakiya Tarun Sangh in 1937 at Margao.

In 2010, Chief Minister, Digambar Kamat paid visit to Madkaikar on his 100th birthday. In his regard the CM said, “Madkaikar not only fought for Goa’s Liberation, but work for the State and its people post Liberation."

References

Konkani people
Communist Party of India politicians from Goa
Indian independence activists from Goa
1910 births
2011 deaths